Douglas R. Bovin (born August 24, 1944) was a Democratic member of the Michigan House of Representatives from 1999-2002 representing Delta, Dickinson and Menominee counties in the Upper Peninsula. Prior to his election to the House, Bovin served for 22 years on the Delta County Board of Commissioners, including 16 as its chairman, nine years on the Gladstone City Commission, and four years as mayor of Gladstone. He currently serves on the Lake Superior State University Board of Trustees.

Bovin is a past president of both the National Association of Counties and the Michigan Association of Counties, and was the city manager of Munising for 10 years.

References

External links
 Douglas Bovin | C-SPAN.org

1944 births
Living people
People from Gladstone, Michigan
Northern Michigan University alumni
Mayors of places in Michigan
Michigan city council members
County commissioners in Michigan
Democratic Party members of the Michigan House of Representatives
20th-century American politicians
21st-century American politicians